Tsesarevich Alexis may refer to:

Alexei Petrovich, Tsarevich of Russia (1690–1718), son and heir apparent of Peter the Great
Alexei Nikolaevich, Tsarevich of Russia (1904–1918), son and heir apparent of Nicholas II of Russia